Gonatodus is an extinct genus of palaeonisciform fish that lived during the Tournaisian stage of the Mississippian epoch. It is a member of the family Elonichthyidae.

See also

 Prehistoric fish
 List of prehistoric bony fish

References

Mississippian fish